Kneib is a surname. Notable people with the surname include:

Viktor Kneib (born 1980), Russian luger
Wolfgang Kneib (born 1952), German footballer